Hussein Kamal (17 August 1932 – 24 March 2003) was an Egyptian television, film and theatre director. He is considered to be an important director of traditional Egyptian cinema. One of his most famous films is Chitchat on the Nile (1971), a critique of the decadence of Egyptian society during the Nasser era. His 1972 film Empire M was entered into the 8th Moscow International Film Festival in 1973.

Selected filmography

Film
 The Impossible (1965)
 A Taste of Fear (1969)
 My Father Up on the Tree (1969)
 Chitchat on the Nile (1971)
 Empire M (1972)

Television
 The Return of the Spirit (1977)

References

External links

1932 births
2003 deaths
Egyptian film directors